The Backseat Film Festival is an independent film festival organized by Doug Sakmann, Nick Esposito, and Zafer Ulkucu.

Beginning in Park City, Utah, during the winter of 2003 as one of many alternatives to the Sundance Film Festival it quickly transformed into a touring festival that continues to the present day.

During the summer of 2003 the festival joined forces with the Vans Warped Tour and its screening bus, the Dirty Erin, traveled through 44 cities across North America playing films for tens of thousands of young people.  Doug Sakmann, former Festival Director for the Troma Films' Tromadance Film Festival, filmed a slasher film series Punk Rock Holocaust during this tour which garnered international press attention for the festival.

Backseat is currently based in Philadelphia, Pennsylvania.  The touring festival travels across the U.S. each year screening films for those interested in edgy, alternative indy films.  It has also showcased its film lineup at the Cannes Film Festival.

Featured films
Punk Rock Holocaust
Plaster Caster
Automatons
Stupid Teenagers Must Die!
Fudge 44
Prison-A-Go-Go!
God Squad!
Stupid Teenagers Must Die
FUBAR: The Movie
Razor Sharp
Gimme Skelter
The Making of The Green Goblin's Last Stand
Films by Rusty Nails
Hot Rod Girls Save The World

References

External links

Film festivals in Utah
Fantasy and horror film festivals in the United States